Javier Prieto (born 2 August 1949) is a Mexican sailor. He competed in the Flying Dutchman event at the 1976 Summer Olympics.

References

External links
 

1949 births
Living people
Mexican male sailors (sport)
Olympic sailors of Mexico
Sailors at the 1976 Summer Olympics – Flying Dutchman
Place of birth missing (living people)